De Kelders (or Die Kelders; Afrikaans: "the caves") is a coastal village in the Overberg District Municipality, Western Cape, South Africa.

Holiday resort 19 km south-west of Stanford, between Gans Bay and Hermanus. Afrikaans for ‘the cellars’, the name is derived from caves in sandstone cliffs there. De Kelders is also an excellent whale watching location.

References

Populated places in the Overstrand Local Municipality